The 2002–03 Coppa Italia was the 56th edition of the tournament, which began on August 18, 2002 and ended on May 31, 2003. In the final, Milan beat Roma 6–3 on aggregate to win their 5th Coppa Italia and first since the 1976–77 edition.

Group stage

Group 1

Group 2

Group 3

Group 4

Group 5

Group 6

Group 7

Group 8

Knockout stage

Final

First leg

Second leg

Milan won 6–3 on aggregate.

Top goalscorers

References
rsssf.com
footballdatabase.eu

Coppa Italia seasons
Italy
Coppa Italia